UCAM or UCam may refer 

 The University of Cambridge, Cambridge, England 
The Catholic University of San Antonio (in Spanish, Universidad Católica San Antonio de Murcia),
The Universidade Cândido Mendes, Rio de Janeiro, Brazil
CAM software from Ucamco, Gent, Belgium